Chaceon is a crab genus in the family Geryonidae, and was first described in 1989 by Raymond Manning and Lipke Holthuis.

Species 
 Chaceon affinis (A. Milne-Edwards & Bouvier, 1894)
 Chaceon albus Davie, Ng & Dawson, 2007
 Chaceon alcocki Ghosh & Manning, 1993
 Chaceon atopus Manning & Holthuis, 1989
 Chaceon australis Manning, 1993
 Chaceon bicolor Manning & Holthuis, 1989
 Chaceon chilensis Chirino-Gálvez & Manning, 1989
 Chaceon chuni (Macpherson, 1983)
 Chaceon collettei Manning, 1992
 Chaceon crosnieri Manning & Holthuis, 1989
 Chaceon eldorado Manning & Holthuis, 1989
 Chaceon erytheiae (Macpherson, 1984)
 Chaceon fenneri (Manning & Holthuis, 1984)
 Chaceon gordonae (Ingle, 1985)
 Chaceon goreni Galil & Manning, 2001
 Chaceon granulatus (Sakai, 1978)
 Chaceon imperialis Manning, 1992
 Chaceon inghami (Manning & Holthuis, 1986)
 Chaceon inglei Manning & Holthuis, 1989
 Chaceon karubar Manning, 1993
 Chaceon macphersoni (Manning & Holthuis, 1988)
 Chaceon manningi Ng, Lee & Yu, 1994
 Chaceon maritae (Manning & Holthuis, 1981)
 Chaceon mediterraneus Manning & Holthuis, 1989
 Chaceon micronesicus Ng & Manning, 1998
 Chaceon notialis Manning & Holthuis, 1989
 Chaceon paulensis (Chun, 1903)
 Chaceon poupini Manning, 1992
 Chaceon quinquedens (Smith, 1879)
 Chaceon ramosae Manning, Tavares & Albuquerque, 1989
 Chaceon sanctaehelenae Mannig & Holthuis, 1989
 Chaceon sanctahelenae Manning & Holthuis, 1989
 Chaceon somaliensis Manning, 1993
 Chaceon yaldwyni Manning, Dawson & Webber, 1990

See also 
 List of prehistoric malacostracans

References

External links

Portunoidea
Decapod genera
Taxa named by Raymond B. Manning